The discography of Nek, an Italian pop rock singer, contains thirteen Italian-language studio album, nine Spanish-language studio albums, five Italian and Spanish compilation albums, and forty-eight singles.

Nek's debut album, the self-titled Nek, was released by Fonit Cetra in Italy in 1992 after he had come in second at the Castrocaro Song Festival. In 1993 Nek released his second album In te followed by his third album Calore umano in the summer of 1994. In 1997 he took part in the Sanremo Music Festival, in the "Star" category, with the song "Laura non c'è" which reached number one on the Italian Singles Chart and went on to become his international breakthrough as it reached the Top Ten in Germany, Switzerland, Austria and Belgium. Lei, gli amici e tutto il resto, his fourth album and his first for WEA/Warner Music, went on to sell two million copies worldwide and was his first album to also be recorded in a Spanish-language version.

Nek's fifth album, In due was released in June 1998 and he followed it with La vita è in 2000 and Le cose da difendere in 2002. Nek celebrated his first ten years as a recording artist with The Best of Nek: L'anno zero in October 2003. The album sold over 300,000 copies in Italy alone, and soared to the top of the charts, where it stayed for 11 weeks in the Top 10. All of Nek's studio albums since 1997 have reached the Top 10 on the Italian Albums Chart. Una parte di me, which was released in
May 2005, sold over 200,000 copies in Italy and included the hit single "Lascia che io sia", one of the Top Ten best-selling singles of 2005 in Italy. Nek released his 10th album Nella stanza 26 in 2006, and in 2007 he recorded a new version of the Spanish-language version of "Lascia che io sia", titled "Para ti seria", with the Spanish band El Sueño de Morfeo, which was hugely successful on Spanish Download chart and sold more than 250,000 downloads.

Another international collaboration followed in 2008 when he recorded a duet version of "Walking Away" with Craig David, which was included on Nek's tenth studio album Un'altra direzione, which became his first number-one album on FIMI's Italian Albums Chart. In November 2010 Nek celebrated his first twenty years as an artist with the compilation album Greatest Hits 1992–2010: E da qui.

Albums

Studio albums

Compilation albums

Collaborative albums

Singles

As lead artist
{|class="wikitable plainrowheaders" style="text-align:center;" border="1"
|+ List of singles, with selected chart positions, showing year released and album name
! scope="col" rowspan="2" style="width:250px;"| Single
! scope="col" rowspan="2"| Year
! scope="col" colspan="9"| Peak chart positions
! scope="col" rowspan="2" style="width:150px;"| Certifications
! scope="col" rowspan="2"| Album
|-
! scope="col" style="width:35px;font-size:85%;"| ITA <ref name="ITASingles">
Listed positions refer to ''Musica e dischis single chart for releases until 1997, to the FIMI Singles Chart for singles released starting from January 1997. Until the end of 2008, FIMI's chart was based on physical sales only. However, starting from 2006, a Digital Singles chart was compiled, and it gradually replaced the physical singles chart as the Italian primary chart starting from 1 January 2008.
Peak positions on the Italian Singles Chart:
 All the singles except where noted: 
 "Laura non c'è": 
 "Domani 21/04.09": 
 "Se non ami" : 
 "E da qui": 
 "Congiunzione astrale": 
 "La metà di niente": 
 "Se telefonando" 
 "Unici" 
 "Freud" 
 "Anni luce" 
</ref> 
! scope="col" style="width:35px;font-size:85%;"| AUT 
! scope="col" style="width:35px;font-size:85%;"| BEL(WA) 
! scope="col" style="width:35px;font-size:85%;"| FRA 
! scope="col" style="width:35px;font-size:85%;"| GER 
! scope="col" style="width:35px;font-size:85%;"| SPA 
! scope="col" style="width:35px;font-size:85%;"| SWI  
! scope="col" style="width:35px;font-size:85%;"| UK 
! scope="col" style="width:35px;font-size:85%;"| USLatin 
|-
!scope="row"|"Amami"
|1992
| — || — || — || — || — || — || — || — || —
|
|Nek
|-
!scope="row"|"In te"
|rowspan="2"|1993
| — || — || — || — || — || — || — || — || —
|
|rowspan="2"|In te
|-
!scope="row"|"Uomo con te"
| — || — || — || — || — || — || — || — || —
|
|-
!scope="row"|"Calore umano"
|rowspan="3"|1994
| — || — || — || — || — || — || — || — || —
|
|rowspan="3"|Calore umano
|- 
!scope="row"|"Angeli nel ghetto"
| — || — || — || — || — || — || — || — || —
|
|-
!scope="row"|"Cuori in tempesta"
| — || — || — || — || — || — || — || — || —
|
|-
!scope="row"|"Tu sei, tu sai"
|rowspan="3"|1996
| — || — || — || — || — || — || — || — || —
|
|rowspan="7"|Lei, gli amici e tutto il resto  /Nek (1997)
|-
!scope="row"|"Vivere senza te" / Cómo vivir sin ti"
| — || — || — || — || — || — || — || — || —
|
|-
!scope="row"|"Fianco a fianco"
| — || — || — || — || — || — || — || — || —
|
|-
!scope="row"|"Laura non c'è" / "Laura no está"
|rowspan="4"|1997
| 1 || 3 || 7 || 11 || 10 || — || 2 || 59 || 21
|
 FIMI: Gold
 SNEP: Gold
|-
!scope="row"|"Sei grande" / "Tu nombre"
| — || — || — || — || — || 6 || — || — || —
|
|-
!scope="row"|"Dimmi cos'è"
| — || — || 32 || — || — || — || — || — || —
|
|-
!scope="row"|"Espérame"
| — || — || — || — || — || — || — || — || —
|
|-
!scope="row"|"Se io non avessi te" / "Si sé que te tengo a ti"
|rowspan="4"|1998
| — || — || — || — || 73 || — || — || — || —
|
|rowspan="4"|In due /Entre tú y yo
|-
!scope="row"|"Sto con te" / "Quédate"
| — || — || — || — || — || — || — || — || —
|
|-
!scope="row"|"Se una regola c'è" / "No preguntes por qué"
| — || — || — || — || 84 || — || — || — || —
|
|-
!scope="row"|"Con un ma e con un se" / "Su tal vez, su quizá"
| — || 29 || — || — || 82 || — || — || — || —
|
|-
!scope="row"|"Ci sei tu" / "Llegas tú"
|rowspan="4"|2000
|9 || — || — || — || 83 || — || 58 || — || —
|
|rowspan="4"|La vita è /La vida es
|-
!scope="row"|"Sul treno" / "En el tren"
| — || — || — || — || — || — || — || — || —
|
|-
!scope="row"|"La vita è" / "La vida es"
| 26 || — || — || — || 100 || — || — || — || —
|
|-
!scope="row"|"Lleno de energìa"
| — || — || — || — || — || — || — || — || —
|
|-
!scope="row"|"Sei solo tu" / "Tan sólo tú"(featuring Laura Pausini)
|rowspan="4"|2002
| 3 || — || — || 55 || — || — || 46 || — || 36
|
|rowspan="5"|Le cose da difendere /Las cosas que defenderé
|-
!scope="row"|"Parliamo al singolare" / "Hablemos en pasado"
| — || — || — || — || — || — || — || — || —
|
|-
!scope="row"|"Cielo e terra" / "Cielo y tierra"
| 32 || — || — || — || — || — || — || — || —
|
|-
!scope="row"|"Las cosas que defenderé"
| — || — || — || — || — || — || — || — || —
|
|-
!scope="row"|"Tutto di te"
|rowspan="3"|2003
| — || — || — || — || — || — || — || — || —
|
|-
!scope="row"|"Almeno stavolta" / "Al menos ahora"
| 5 || — || — || — || — || — || 43 || — || —
|
|rowspan="2"|The Best of Nek: L'anno zero /Lo mejor de Nek: El año cero
|- 
!scope="row"|"L'anno zero" / "El año cero"
| — || — || — || — || — || — || — || — || —
|
|-
!scope="row"|"Lascia che io sia" / "Para ti sería"
|rowspan="2"|2005
| 2 || — || — || — || — || — || 38 || — || —
|
 FIMI: 2xPlatinum
|rowspan="3"|Una parte di me /Una parte de mí
|-
!scope="row"|"Contromano" / "A contramano"
| — || — || — || — || — || — || — || — || —
|
|-
!scope="row"|"L'inquietudine" / "La inquietud"
|rowspan="2"|2006
| — || — || — || — || — || — || — || — || —
|
|-
!scope="row"|"Instabile" / "Vértigo"
| 3 || — || — || — || — || — || 47 || — || —
|
 FIMI: Gold
|rowspan="3"|Nella stanza 26 /En el cuarto 26
|-
!scope="row"|"Notte di febbraio" / "Noche de febrero"
|rowspan="2"|2007
| — || — || — || — || — || — || — || — || —
|
|-
!scope="row"|"Nella stanza 26" / "En el cuarto 26"
| — || — || — || — || — || — || — || — || —
|
|-
!scope="row"|"La voglia che non vorrei" / "Deseo que ya no puede ser"
|rowspan="3"|2009
| 9 || — || — || — || — || 37 || 53 || — || —
|
|rowspan="3"|Un'altra direzione /Nuevas direcciones
|-
!scope="row"|"Se non ami" / "Si no amas"
| 40 || — || — || — || — || — || — || — || —
|
|-
!scope="row"|"Semplici emozioni" / "Simples emociones"
| — || — || — || — || — || — || — || — || —
|
|-
!scope="row"|"E da qui" / "Es así"
|2010
| 24 || — || — || — || — || — || — || — || —
|
|rowspan="3"|Greatest Hits 1992–2010: E da qui /Greatest Hits 1992-2010: Es así
|-
!scope="row"|"Vulnerabile"
|rowspan="2"|2011
| — || — || — || — || — || — || — || — || —
|
|-
!scope="row"|"È con te" / "Para tí"
| — || — || — || — || — || — || — || — || —
|
|-
!scope="row"|"Neroverdi"
|rowspan="3"|2013
| — || — || — || — || — || — || — || — || —
|
|
|-
!scope="row"|"Congiunzione astrale" / "Conjunción astral"
| 39 || — || — || — || — || — || — || — || —
|
|rowspan="3"|Filippo Neviani
|-
!scope="row"|"La metà di niente" / "La mitad de nada"
| 70 || — || — || — || — || — || — || — || —
|
|-
!scope="row"|"Hey Dio" / "Hey Dios"
|2014
| — || — || — || — || — || — || — || — || —
|
|-
! scope="row"| "Fatti avanti amore" / "Sigue hacia adelante"
|rowspan="3"| 2015
| 3 || — || — || — || — || — || 39 || — || —
|
 FIMI: Platinum
|rowspan="3"| Prima di parlare /Antes de que hables
|-
!scope="row"|"Se telefonando"
| 34 || — || — || — || — || — || — || — || —
|
 FIMI: Platinum
|-
!scope="row"|"Io ricomincerei"
| — || — || — || — || — || — || — || — || —
|
|-
!scope="row"|"Uno di questi giorni"
|rowspan="3"| 2016
| 49 || — || — || — || — || — || — || — || —
|
 FIMI: Gold
|rowspan="4"|Unici
|-
!scope="row"|"Unici"
| 61 || — || — || — || — || — || — || — || —
|
 FIMI: Gold
|-
!scope="row"|"Differente"
| — || — || — || — || — || — || — || — || —
|
 FIMI: Gold
|-
!scope="row"|"Freud"(feat. J-Ax)
|rowspan="1"| 2017
| 59 || — || — || — || — || — || — || — || —
|
 FIMI: Platinum
|-
!scope="row"|"Mi farò trovare pronto"
|rowspan="3"| 2019
| 41 || — || — || — || — || — || — || — || —
|
|rowspan="3"| Il mio gioco preferito – Parte prima
|-
!scope="row"|"La storia del mondo"
| — || — || — || — || — || — || — || — || —
|
|-
!scope="row"|"Sube la radio"
| — || — || — || — || — || — || — || — || —
|
|-
| align="center" colspan="30" style="font-size:85%"| "—" denotes singles that did not chart or were not released.
|}

As featured artist

Other charted songs

Guest appearances

NotesA'''  "Laura (Laura non c'è)" did not enter the Ultratop 50, but peaked at number 2 on the Wallonia Ultratip chart, which acts as an extension to the Ultratop 40.

References

 
Nek
Pop music discographies